Brian Kane Floca (born January 11, 1969) is an American writer and illustrator of children's books. He is best known for illustrating books written by Avi and for nonfiction picture books. In 2014, he won the Caldecott Medal for his book, Locomotive, as well as the Robert F. Sibert Informational Book Award Honor.

Biography 

Floca was born and raised in Temple, Texas. He graduated from Brown University in 1991, and currently lives and works in Brooklyn, New York.

Published works

As writer and illustrator 
The Frightful Story of Harry Walfish (1997)
Five Trucks (1999)
Dinosaurs at the Ends of the Earth: The Story of the Central Asiatic Expeditions (2000)
The Racecar Alphabet (2003)
Up in the Air: The Story of the Wright Brothers (2003)
Lightship (2007)
Moonshot: The Flight Of Apollo 11 (2009)
Locomotive (2013)

As illustrator 
City of Light, City of Dark: A Comic Book Novel (1993)
Luck with Potatoes (1995)
The Voyager’s Stone: The Adventures of a Message-Carrying Bottle Adrift on the Ocean Sea (1995)
Poppy (1995)
Jenius: The Amazing Guinea Pig (1996)
The Ghoul Brothers (1996)
Where Are You, Little Zack? (1997)
Wing It! The Best Boomerang Book Ever (1997)
Counting Feathers (1997)
Mixed-Up Max (1997)
King Max (1998)
Poppy and Rye (1998)
That Toad Is Mine! (1998)
Lightning Liz (1998)
The Ultimate Yo-Yo Book (1998)
Ragweed (1999)
Solomon Sneezes (1999)
Make Your Own Time Capsule (1999)
Sports! Sports! Sports!: A Poetry Collection (1999)
Ereth's Birthday (2000)
Let's Fly a Kite (2000)
Another Great Yo-Yo Book: More Great Tricks and Tips! (2000)
Tales from Dimwood Forest (2001)
A Mountain Lion Ate the Corn Chips (2001)
Ethan's Cat (2002)
Ethan's Bike (2002)
Ethan's Lunch (2002)
Ethan Out and About (2002)
Ethan's Birds (2002)
The Mayor of Central Park (2003)
Ethan at Home (2003)
Uncles and Antlers (2004)
Billy and the Rebel: Base on a True Civil War Story (2005)
From Slave to Soldier: Based on a True Civil War Story (2005)
Bartleby of the Big, Bad Bayou (2005)
Poppy's Return (2005)
Max & Mo Make A Snowman (2005)
Max & Mo's First Day at School (2007)
Max & Mo Go Apple Picking (2007)
The Hinky-Pink (2007)

Other 
Beatrice Black Bear – a regular feature in Click magazine.

Awards 
 2014 Winner, Caldecott Medal
 2014 Honor, Robert F. Sibert Informational Book Award
 2015 Honor, Irma Black Award

References

External links

 
 

Living people
American children's writers
American children's book illustrators
Caldecott Medal winners
Children's non-fiction writers
People from Temple, Texas
Writers from Texas
Year of birth missing (living people)